Yusuf Khan, popularly known as Zebisko  from Amar Akbar Anthony, was an Indian actor in Hindi-language films. Although Khan acted in 35 films and remained popular as a rather sympathetic villain through the 1970s and 1980s with films like Amar Akbar Anthony (1977), Muqaddar Ka Sikandar (1978) and Disco Dancer (1982), he is mostly remembered for his role of Zebisko, the bodyguard of Parveen Babi's character in Manmohan Desai's film Amar Akbar Anthony (1977).

Personal life and career

Khan was born in Egypt as Yousuff Abousher. He came to Bombay, India, and became a Bollywood actor. He is the father of Bollywood actor Faraaz Khan.
He also used the screen name Yash Raj (Bombay To Goa). Khan's final film role was Bhediyon Ka Samooh: A Pack of Wolves which was released after his death. He died in Hyderabad in 1985 from a brain hemorrhage.

Filmography

External links 

 

1984 deaths
Indian male film actors
Male actors in Hindi cinema
People from Hyderabad district, India